Gargousse is a 1938 French comedy film directed by Henry Wulschleger and starring Bach,  Saturnin Fabre and Jeanne Fusier-Gir.

The film's art direction was by Henri Ménessier.

Cast
 Bach as Gargousse  
 Saturnin Fabre as Lebrennois, le maire  
 Jeanne Fusier-Gir as Anaïs Lebrennois  
 Sinoël as Le facteur  
 Max Fontal as Allain  
 Georges Montel as Le garde-champêtre  
 Louis Lorsy as Rousseau  
 Paul Ollivier as Le docteur Larmoyer  
 Marie-Therese Fleury as Antoinette  
 Henri Pfeifer as L'Abricot  
 Milly Mathis as La buraliste  
 Suzanne Dehelly as Zozo 
 Lucien Callamand as Un gendarme  
 Maurice Schutz

References

Bibliography 
 Alfred Krautz. International directory of cinematographers set- and costume designers in film. Saur, 1983.

External links 
 

1938 films
French comedy films
1938 comedy films
1930s French-language films
Films directed by Henry Wulschleger
French black-and-white films
1930s French films